Peter Kuiper (Langsa, 30 March 1929 – Berlin, 28 September 2007) was a German actor of film, theatre and television.

He died in Berlin from undisclosed causes in 2007.

Filmography

External links

Matthies Agency Berlin 

1929 births
2007 deaths
German male film actors
German male television actors
20th-century German male actors
21st-century German male actors
Male actors from Berlin
People from Langsa